Deseret may refer to:

Places
 Deseret, Utah, an unincorporated community
 Fort Deseret
 Deseret Ranches, Florida, US
 State of Deseret, a provisional US state, 1849–1851

Arts, entertainment, and media
 Deseret (film), a 1995 experimental documentary film
Deseret, a fictional state in The Folk of the Fringe (1989) by Orson Scott Card
 Deseret, a fictional state in Harry Turtledove's Southern Victory Series
 Deseret News, a Utah newspaper

Other uses
 Deseret (Book of Mormon), meaning "honeybee"
 Deseret alphabet, a 19th c. phonemic English spelling reform
 Deseret (Unicode block)
 Deseret Test Center, 1960s U.S. Army CBW test facility
 University of Deseret, 1850–1892, now University of Utah
 Deseret Nation, or #DezNat; users described as alt-right Mormons

See also